Maximilian "Maxie" Zeus is a supervillain appearing in American comic books published by DC Comics, primarily as a minor enemy of Batman. He is depicted as a mentally ill former history professor who is obsessed with Greek mythology and believes himself to be the god Zeus, becoming a crime lord in Gotham City.

Publication history
Maxie Zeus first appeared in Detective Comics #483 (April–May 1979) and was created by Denny O'Neil and Don Newton.

Fictional character biography

Criminal career
Maxie Zeus is a former Greek history teacher who started to suffer from insanity when he lost his wife. He became a criminal mastermind and used his cunning and intelligence to rise to power amidst the chaos in Gotham City's underworld. He has fought Batman on several occasions before being committed to Arkham Asylum.

Because Maxie seemed less dangerous than Joker, Two-Face, and other notorious Arkham inmates, Arkham's administrators did not commit him in the maximum security wing, despite repeated recommendations from Batman to do so. Batman's concern was vindicated when Maxie escaped to form a team of Greek Mythology-based superhuman agents called the New Olympians. He attempted to kidnap Olympic athlete Lacinia Nitocris and force her to marry him and become a mother to his daughter Medea. This plot was foiled by Batman and the Outsiders, who bested the New Olympians in a series of Olympic-style games.

Maxie was one of the villains that escaped Arkham when Bane brought down the walls of Arkham Asylum in the Knightfall storyline. Maxie's escape attempt was disrupted when he collided with a tree. Some time later, however, he was drawn into a plot engineered by the Children of Ares—Deimos, Phobos—and Eris (Ares' sister) to merge Gotham City with Ares' throne capital, the Aeropagus. The intent was to re-establish Ares' rule on Earth, with his children possessing the Joker, Scarecrow and Poison Ivy respectively to manifest on this plane. Maxie was killed as a result of that plot, and his sacrifice brought about Ares' return. Their scheme was foiled by Wonder Woman, Batman and their allies, and Ares himself banished his children back to Tartarus.

Robin
In issues of Robin, a vigilante called Violet was trying to track down an illegal casino named "Maxie's", with chips bearing a Zeus-like profile. Presumably, Maxie survived his encounter with the Children of Ares. After Violet was discovered by Maxie Zeus's guards, both Robin and Violet managed to escape unharmed as detectives that Robin was working with on the case raided the casino and arrested Maxie Zeus, who surrendered without a fight after an officer physically threatened him.

Batman: Cacophony
Maxie returns in Kevin Smith's Batman: Cacophony. Apparently cured of his delusions, he has been hired by Joker to use Joker Venom on random people on April First as an April Fool's Day joke, but instead mixes the poison with ecstasy to produce a new designer drug called "Chuckles". He uses the profits to fund his empire as well as building his dream of creating a public school that is run like a private school. The Joker, angry that his creation is being used for a noble purpose, swears revenge against Maxie. After witnessing the death of his nephew and a dozen other children when the Joker blows up a school, Maxie suffers a psychotic break and reverts to his Zeus persona. After Batman rescues him from an attack by the Joker at a nightclub, he visits Maxie again at his penthouse. After temporarily restoring Maxie's sanity with a massive dose of antipsychotics, Batman convinces him to confess and turn himself in to the police. This move is later revealed to be part of Batman's plan to lure the Joker and Onomatopoeia out of hiding.

The New 52
As part of The New 52 reboot of DC Universe, in the Batman Eternal story, Maxie Zeus is used as a host for the spirit of Deacon Blackfire as he attempts to use the spirits of the Arkham Asylum inmates to return to life only to be thwarted by Batwing and Jim Corrigan. Following Arkham Asylum's destruction, Maggie Sawyer attempts to get answers from Maxie Zeus on what happened.

Doomsday Clock
In the Watchmen sequel Doomsday Clock, Maxie Zeus was at Arkham Asylum when Rorschach was incarcerated there by Batman.

Other versions

Arkham Asylum: A Serious House on Serious Earth
An electrified, emaciated version of Maxie Zeus appears in the graphic novel Arkham Asylum: A Serious House on Serious Earth by Grant Morrison and Dave McKean. Batman finds him connected to the electroshock therapy room of Arkham Asylum, perpetually receiving electrical currents, which he believes to be "fire from heaven". On the one occasion in the story in which he and Batman cross paths, he compares himself to the supreme gods in many mythologies. He also does not recognize Batman, warmly addressing him as "a pilgrim". Early drafts of the script describes Zeus as resembling his original comic book counterpart, but with female breasts and genitalia crudely drawn on his filthy toga.

The Batman Adventures
In The Batman Adventures (a comic series based on the animated series), Maxie Zeus escapes Arkham Asylum several times and teams up with villains such as Lex Luthor and Ra's al Ghul to destroy Gotham. Each time, he is foiled by Batman and Robin and returned to Arkham.

The Batman Strikes!
In an issue of The Batman Strikes!, Maxie Zeus joins a group of villains led by the Joker. This was revealed to be a simulation created by Batman to train Robin. On a later issue, Maxie Zeus goes on a criminal rampage alongside Ragdoll, Spellbinder, and an Everywhere Man, but is defeated by Batgirl.

Batman Beyond
In the Batman Beyond comic series, Bruce tells Terry a secured location where he has kept some of his most disturbed rogues in captivity. Maxie Zeus and Mad Hatter were among the catatonic inhabitants. It's possible that Maxie suffered a great deal from electro shock, brought on by the crude methods at Arkham Asylum, or from his delusions of godhood which forced him to wield a lightning-discharging staff.

In other media

Television

 Maximilian "Maxie" Zeus appears in the Batman: The Animated Series episode "Fire From Olympus", voiced by Steve Susskind. This version is a shipping tycoon who began smuggling goods to support his faltering business. Due to stress and the threat of legal action, he suffered a nervous breakdown, developed a god complex, and started to believe that he is the Greek god Zeus. As part of his delusions, he begins carrying an electrified thunderbolt-shaped metal rod, and sees his girlfriend as Clio and Batman as Hades. After Zeus steals an electron discharge cannon to use on "pitiful mortals" who dare to oppose him, his girlfriend attempts to stop him. He almost regains his senses, but then attempts to kill her until Batman intervenes and subdues him. As Maxie is dragged to his cell in Arkham Asylum, he sees his fellow inmates as Greek gods and believes he has returned to Mount Olympus.
 Maxie Zeus appears in The Batman, voiced by Phil LaMarr. This version is an eccentric multimillionaire obsessed with Greek mythology, history, and culture. Additionally, he detests being called "Maxie", preferring to be called "Maximilian". Introduced in the episode "Thunder", Zeus attempts to run for mayor of Gotham City, but loses the election after announcing his plan to revolutionize the Gotham City Police Department (GCPD) by basing them on his own gladiator-themed security forces. Angered by his defeat, the narcissistic Zeus dons a high-tech gladiator-themed suit of armor with electric gloves and plots to use his airship, New Olympus, to turn Gotham into his personal kingdom, only to be foiled by Batman and Batgirl. Zeus also makes a cameo in the episode "Rumors" as one of several supervillains captured by the vigilante Rumor.
 Maxie Zeus appears in Harley Quinn, voiced by Will Sasso. This version is a member of the Legion of Doom and a self-help guru for aspiring supervillains who most notably stole the medals for the 1996 Summer Olympics and can generate lightning from his hands. In the episode "So, You Need a Crew?", Harley Quinn comes to him for help in becoming her own supervillain, but he reveals his sexist nature and requests sexual favors from her in exchange. Insulted, Harley teams up with Clayface and Doctor Psycho to get payback. In "Bachelorette", Zeus works as an employee at a strip club on an island near Themyscira and enters a relationship with the widowed Nora Fries. In "Something Borrowed, Something Green", he and Nora attend Poison Ivy and Kite Man's wedding and take part in a war between the other attending supervillains and the GCPD. As of the episode "It's A Swamp Thing", he and Nora have broken up.

Video games
Maxie Zeus appears in the NES version of Batman: The Video Game.

See also
 List of Batman family enemies

References

External links
 Maxie Zeus at DC Comics Wiki

DC Comics male supervillains
Comics characters introduced in 1979
Characters created by Dennis O'Neil
Fictional schoolteachers
Fictional gangsters
Fictional characters with neurological or psychological disorders
Fictional crime bosses